Peter J. Halat, Jr. (born July 27, 1942) is an American politician and lawyer who served as the twelfth mayor of Biloxi, Mississippi, and was later charged for his involvement in a criminal conspiracy which led to the 1987 murders of Halat's former law partner, Mississippi judge Vincent Sherry, and Sherry's wife Margaret, a Biloxi city councilwoman. He was found guilty and sentenced to 18 years in prison, of which he served 15.

Halat was elected mayor in 1989 and lost a re-election bid in 1993. The FBI investigation eventually ended the city's long tolerance for wide open, illegal gambling and striptease clubs with exorbitantly priced drinks, the purchase of which served as a front for prostitution.

History
Pete Halat and Vincent Sherry became law partners in 1981. Sherry was appointed a circuit judge in 1986.

Dixie Mafia killings
Through his association with Mike Gillich, a leading Biloxi underworld figure, Halat became the attorney for Kirksey Nix, a Dixie Mafia criminal serving life in the Louisiana State Penitentiary for the 1971 murder of New Orleans grocer Frank J. Corso. Having exhausted his appeals, Nix's only path to freedom was a governor's pardon. In the hopes of earning enough money to buy an illicit pardon, Nix was running a dating scam from inside prison targeting homosexual men. By personal ads and letters, Nix would pose as a gay single man and entice  victims into a relationship, frequently by sending sexually explicit photos cut out from magazines. He would then  concoct fictitious stories for needing money, such as being in trouble with the law and needing to pay hefty legal expenses or needing additional money in order to move in with a victim. The operation was run from both Nix's prison cell in Louisiana and, after Vincent Sherry left the law firm to become a judge, by Nix's girlfriend Sheri LaRa Sharpe at the Halat and Sherry law office.

Nix's co-conspirator Halat had stolen hundreds of thousands of dollars from Nix to cover financial difficulties and blamed the loss of the money on Vincent Sherry. Kirksey Nix believed Halat's claim and ordered the deaths of Judge Sherry and his wife. Thomas Holcomb was hired by Nix to murder the couple in their home.

Conviction
On October 23, 1996, Halat was indicted on federal charges related to his involvement in the 1987 murders of Vincent and Margaret Sherry. At the time the FBI believed that the two were killed on Halat's orders after he thought that Judge Sherry was stealing from a bank account Halat kept for an imprisoned client, which held funds from Kirksey Nix's "Lonely Hearts" dating scam targeting gay men. It would later turn out however, that Vincent Sherry had never stolen money from Kirksey Nix's dating scam and that it was in fact Pete Halat himself who had stolen upwards of $100,000 U.S. dollars from the Lonely Hearts scam. When Nix was enraged over noticing the amount of missing money and arranged for Pete Halat to visit him in prison and demanded an explanation from him, Halat quickly blamed Judge Sherry for the theft of the illicit funds and the two quietly agreed to have Judge Sherry and his wife murdered. Shortly thereafter, Kirksey Nix ordered the deaths of Vincent and Margaret Sherry for the alleged theft of his money, and the Dixie Mafia's leader on the streets, Mike Gillich, hired a hitman from Texas named Thomas Holcomb to commit the two murders. Thomas Leslie Holcomb was given the handgun with a homemade silencer which he used in the killings by Kirksey Nix's girlfriend Sheri LaRa Sharpe, who in turn had received the gun from an enforcer for the Dixie Mafia named John Ransom who told her to give the gun to Holcomb for the hit on Mr. and Mrs. Sherry.

Halat was later convicted in 1997 of conspiracy to commit racketeering, obstruction of justice, conspiracy to obstruct justice, and conspiracy to commit wire fraud and was sentenced to serve 18 years in prison.

Release
Halat was released in 2013 after 15 years, 9 months and 7 days in jail at the age of 70. He then  worked at a church in Hattiesburg the remainder of the year. Halat still maintains he had no part in the murder plot.

Co-conspirators
Kirksey McCord Nix Jr. (born 1943) is serving life imprisonment in the Federal Correctional Institution at El Reno, Oklahoma. Mike Gillich died of cancer in 2012. Thomas Leslie Holcomb, a Texas-based contract killer, was convicted of carrying out the killings and died in prison in 2005. John Ransom and Sheri LaRa Sharpe were both convicted in 1991 on federal conspiracy charges related to the two murders. Ransom was the Dixie Mafia hitman who supplied the gun used in the murders of Vincent and Margaret Sherry. Sharpe was Kirksey Nix's girlfriend who worked as a legal aid and helped him run his Lonely Hearts dating scam while he was in prison. The scam involved placing fraudulent ads in the national LGBT magazine The Advocate pretending to be young single homosexual men in legal trouble who needed money.

Media portrayals
A 1999 episode of The FBI Files details the FBI investigation of the Dixie Mafia, Pete Halat, and Kirksey Nix and his Lonely Hearts scam. It was also featured in Dominick Dunne's program Power, Privilege, and Justice on January 31, 2007. It is also featured in Season 1, episode 5 of Unusual Suspects.

References

1942 births
20th-century American criminals
Politicians convicted of racketeering
People convicted of obstruction of justice
American people convicted of mail and wire fraud
Living people
Mayors of Biloxi, Mississippi